Egongling River is located in the Longgang District in China.

References 

Rivers of Guangdong